Musculium is a genus of small freshwater clams, aquatic bivalve molluscs in the family Sphaeriidae, the fingernail clams and pea clams.

Species
Species and subgenera within this genera include:

Subgenus Musculium Link, 1807
 Musculium lacustre (O. F. Müller, 1774)
 Musculium transversum (Say, 1829)

Subgenus ?
 Musculium forbesi (Philippi, 1869)
 Musculium lauricochae (Philippi, 1869)
 Musculium titicacense (Pilsbry, 1924)

References

Sphaeriidae
Bivalve genera